M17 is a digital radio modulation mode developed by Wojciech Kaczmarski (amateur radio call sign SP5WWP) et al. 
 M17 is primarily designed for voice communications on VHF amateur radio band and above. The project received a grant from the Amateur Radio Digital Communications in 2021 and 2022. 
The protocol has been integrated into several hardware and software projects.

Overview

M17 utilizes 4,800 symbols per second 4FSK with a root Nyquist filter applied to the bitstream. Radio channels are 9 kHz wide, with channel spacing of 12.5 kHz. The gross data rate is 9,600 bits per second, with the actual data transfer at 3,200.
Protocol allows for low-speed data transfer (along with voice), e.g. GNSS position data.
The mode has been successfully transmitted through EchoStar XXI and QO-100 geostationary satellites.
In 2021, Kaczmarski received the ARRL Technical Innovation Award for developing an open-source digital radio communication protocol, leading to further advancements in amateur radio. The protocol's specification is released under GNU General Public License.

Voice encoding
M17 uses Codec 2, a low bitrate voice codec developed by David Rowe VK5DGR et al. Codec 2 was designed to be used for amateur radio and other high compression voice applications. The protocol supports both 3200 (full-rate) and 1600 bits per second (half-rate) modes.

Error control
Three methods are used for error control: binary Golay code, punctured convolutional code and bit interleaving. Additionally, bits of data are XORed with a predefined decorrelating pseudorandom stream before transmission. This ensures that there are as many symbol transitions in the baseband as possible.

Hardware support
With a small hardware modification, TYT MD-380, MD-390 and MD-UV380 handheld transceivers can be flashed with a custom, free, open source firmware to enable M17 support.

Bridging with other modes
Links to DMR and System Fusion exist.

M17 over IP
Access nodes and repeaters can be linked using reflectors. Over 150 M17 reflectors exist worldwide as of December 2022.

History
The project was started in 2019 by Wojciech Kaczmarski in Warsaw, Poland. A local amateur radio club he was a member of, SP5KAB, was involved in digital voice communications. Kaczmarski, having experimented with TETRA and DMR, decided to create a completely non-proprietary protocol and named it after the club's street address - Mokotowska 17. As every part of the protocol was intended to be open source, Codec 2 released under the GNU GPL 2 license, has been chosen as the speech encoder.

Applications and projects with M17 support
 OpenRTX - free and open-source firmware for ham radios
 DroidStar - digital voice client for Android
 SDR++ - multiplatform, open-source software defined radio receiver
 SDRangel - multiplatform, open-source software defined radio receiver/transmitter
 OpenWebRX - web-based software defined radio receiver
 mrefd
 rpitx

See also 
 NXDN
 D-STAR
 Speech coding
 Quadratic permutation polynomials (QPP)

References

Related links 
 M17 Project's website
 M17 Project on GitHub
 Twitter feed
 Robert Riggs' (WX9O) M17 baseband encoder/decoder library (C++, GPL)
 OpenWebRX - web based SDR by Jakob Ketterl (DD5JFK), includes M17 decoder
 SDR++ - free, open source SDR software with M17 support
 Program to connect to M17 reflectors without RF

Quantized radio modulation modes